Vuorinen is a Finnish surname.

Geographical distribution
As of 2014, 93.9% of all known bearers of the surname Vuorinen were residents of Finland (frequency 1:795), 2.1% of Sweden (1:63,527), and 1.6% of Estonia (1:11,106).

In Finland, the frequency of the surname was higher than national average (1:795) in the following regions:
 1. Tavastia Proper (1:358)
 2. Southwest Finland (1:392)
 3. Pirkanmaa (1:418)
 4. Satakunta (1:562)
 5. Päijänne Tavastia (1:625)
 6. Central Finland (1:763)
 7. Uusimaa (1:776)

People
Kalle Vuorinen (1851–1929), Finnish farmer and politician
Jaakko Vuorinen (1923–1982), Finnish fencer
Matti Vuorinen (born 1948), Finnish mathematician and writer
Petri Vuorinen (born 1972), Finnish football manager
Emppu Vuorinen (born 1978), Finnish guitarist
Hermanni Vuorinen (born 1985), Finnish footballer

References

Finnish-language surnames
Surnames of Finnish origin